Lloyd George Ahern (April 7, 1905 – December 29, 1983) was an American cinematographer. He won an Primetime Emmy Award and was nominated for two more in the category Outstanding Cinematography for his work on the television programs The 20th Century Fox Hour, Columbo and The Love Boat. Ahern died in December 1983 of complications from strokes at the UCLA Medical Center in California, at the age of 78.

References

External links 

1905 births
1983 deaths
People from Biloxi, Mississippi
American cinematographers
Primetime Emmy Award winners